Völschow is a municipality in the Vorpommern-Greifswald district, in Mecklenburg-Vorpommern, Germany. It is located 42 km north of Neubrandenburg and 26 km south of Greifswald.

References

Vorpommern-Greifswald